William Woodruff (1916–2008) was a historian.

William Woodruff is also the name of:

William E. Woodruff (politician) (1795–1885), early American journalist, politician, and pioneer of Arkansas
William E. Woodruff (soldier), colonel in the Army of the Cumberland during the American Civil War
William Woodruff (Upper Canada politician) (1793–1860), merchant and political figure in Upper Canada
Bille Woodruff, video and film director